Promicromonospora iranensis is a bacterium from the genus Promicromonospora which has been isolated from rhizospheric soil in the Fars Province, Iran.

References

External links
Type strain of Promicromonospora iranensis at BacDive -  the Bacterial Diversity Metadatabase

Micrococcales
Bacteria described in 2014